The Algama mine is a large zirconium mine located in Russian Far East in Ayano-Maysky District of Khabarovsk Krai. Algama represents one of the largest zirconium reserves in Russia having estimated reserves of 93.7 million tonnes of ore grading 4.62% zirconium metal.  It is located at the southeast edge of the Stanovoy block of the North Asian Craton.

References 

Zirconium mines in Russia